Bonhamaropa erskinensis is a species of very small air-breathing land snails, terrestrial pulmonate gastropod mollusks in the family  Charopidae. This species is endemic to Australia.

References

Gastropods of Australia
Bonhamaropa
Vulnerable fauna of Australia
Gastropods described in 1930
Taxonomy articles created by Polbot
Taxobox binomials not recognized by IUCN